Shadows and Faces is a 2010 Turkish drama film, written and directed by Turkish Cypriot director Derviş Zaim, which tells the story of a young girl who is separated from her father, a Karagöz shadow play master, during the beginning of the conflict between Turks and Greeks in Cyprus in 1963. It is the third and final part of a trilogy of films themed around traditional Turkish arts, which includes Waiting for Heaven (2006) and Dot (2008).

Cast
 Buğra Gülsoy as Ahmet
 Settar Tanrıöğen as Cevdet
 Cihan Tarıman as Rıza
 Osman Alkaş as Veli
 Popi Avraam as Anna
 Konstantin Gavriel as Hristo
 Ahmet Karabiber as Dimitri
 Erol Refikoğlu as Karagözcü Salih
 Ekrem Yücelten as Arif
 Hazar Ergüçlü as Ruhsar
 Pantelis Antonas as Greek Police Officer
 Derviş Zaim as Turkish Cypriot Commander

Release

Festival screenings 
 47th Antalya "Golden Orange" International Film Festival (October 9–14, 2010)

Reception

Awards 
 47th Antalya "Golden Orange" International Film Festival (October 14, 2010): Turkish Film Critics Association (SİYAD) Award

References

External links

2010 drama films
2010 films
Films set in Cyprus
Films shot in Cyprus
Films directed by Derviş Zaim
Turkish drama films